Darryl Gordon (born March 17, 1989) is an American professional soccer player who last played as a defender for the Miami United in the National Premier Soccer League.

Career

College and youth
Gordon played four years of college soccer at Nova Southeastern University between 2007 and 2010.

While at college, Gordon also appeared for USL PDL club Central Florida Kraze in 2009.

Professional
Gordon signed with Austrian club SC Wiener Viktoria in 2013. He was released in 2014, and signed with North American Soccer League club Fort Lauderdale Strikers on April 7, 2014.

In 2015, Gordan has signed with National Premier Soccer League club Miami United.

References

External links 
 NSU Sharks Profile.

1989 births
Living people
American soccer players
Nova Southeastern Sharks men's soccer players
Orlando City U-23 players
Fort Lauderdale Strikers players
Association football defenders
USL League Two players
North American Soccer League players
Soccer players from Florida